Pick of the Pops is a long-running BBC Radio programme originally based on the Top 20 from the UK Singles Chart and first broadcast on the BBC Light Programme on 4 October 1955. It transferred to BBC Radio 1 (simulcast on BBC Radio 2) from 1967 to 1972. The show was revived for six years in 1989 and its current production run started on BBC Radio 2 in 1997. It is currently hosted by Paul Gambaccini.

Original format (1955–72)
Initially, the show did not feature chart music, but in September 1957 Alan Dell introduced the format of running through the charts of the week, playing the top 10s from various music papers, plus entries to the top 20s.

David Jacobs broadcast the first averaged BBC Top 20 to the helm on Saturday 29 March 1958. Alan Freeman took over in September 1961, taking the show to a regular Sunday slot in January 1962. The program ended in September 1972, while the Top 20 continued as part of "Solid Gold Sixty".

Freeman, who became the show's longest-serving presenter, had been a radio announcer in Melbourne, Australia. Freeman arrived in Britain in 1957 and joined the Light Programme in 1960 to present Records Around Five. That same year he replaced David Jacobs as presenter of Pick of the Pops, which was then part of a Saturday evening program called Trad Tavern, named after traditional jazz, which had a following at the time. Pick of the Pops became a separate program in January 1962. It was produced by Derek Chinnery.

Denys Jones (producer 1961–72) and Freeman split the program into four sections: chart newcomers, new releases, LPs and the Top 10. The program attracted large audiences as the BBC had "needle time" restrictions and could play relatively few commercially available recordings each week. Freeman continued with the show when it moved to Radio 1 and stayed until the program ended on 24 September 1972.

Revivals
Freeman revived Pick of the Pops on London station Capital Radio in 1982. This format broadcast on Capital until 1988 as Pick of the Pops – Take Two, combining the new chart (Top 15s compiled successively by Record Business, the NME, and MRIB) with a chart from the past. In 1989, Freeman returned to Radio 1 where the show featured three past charts each week, and was produced by Phil Swern through March 1992, and for the rest of 1992 by Sue Foster. Freeman stood down from the program in 1992 after stating that he would not present the show again, and signed off with the Beatles' "The End".

However, Freeman revived the show on Capital Gold in April 1994 as Pick of the Pops – Take Three, featuring two vintage top 12s, and the "Battle Of The Giants", and on other occasions featuring three vintage top 10s, two vintage top 20s and a rock request, along with competitions on Saturday mornings.

BBC Radio 2 era (1997–present)

Alan Freeman (April 1997–April 2000)
Pick of the Pops returned to the BBC as an independent production by Unique Broadcasting on BBC Radio 2 on 5 April 1997, with Freeman now counting down two archive charts each Saturday afternoon, featuring the top 10s and interspersing trivia about the records, again researched by producer Swern.

Dale Winton (April 2000–October 2010)
Due to poor health, Freeman retired from radio broadcasting after presenting his last edition of the show on 1 April 2000. He was replaced by Dale Winton, who joined him on this edition. Winton first presented the show solo on 8 April 2000. The regular weekly edition ended on 28 August 2004, with limited a broadcast of special editions on Bank Holidays.

Pick of the Pops then returned every week in September 2005, on a Sunday afternoon, again presented by Winton. The BBC then moved the show to a Saturday lunchtime slot in April 2009, where it remains today.

Winton presented his final Pick of the Pops on 30 October 2010, stepping down due to other commitments.

Tony Blackburn (November 2010–February 2016)
On 24 September 2010, it was announced that Tony Blackburn would replace Winton.  His first show aired on 6 November 2010. Although the show was pre-recorded during the Winton era, from 29 January 2011 the show was mostly broadcast live, which allowed Blackburn to interact with listeners through emails and text messages. In August 2015, Tom Du Croz joined Swern as a producer. Blackburn was dismissed by the BBC on 25 February 2016, having presented his last edition of the show five days earlier.

Mark Goodier (February–July 2016)
Following Blackburn's dismissal, Mark Goodier became a presenter temporarily between 27 February and 2 July 2016.

Paul Gambaccini (July 2016–present)

Paul Gambaccini became a presenter of Pick of the Pops on 9 July 2016, still produced by Swern and Du Croz. Du Croz was later replaced by Heather Wall but returned in 2020. At the start of his tenure as a presenter, Gambaccini featured music from the Billboard charts, along with the UK top 20, but this ended in 2017. Mark Goodier presented the 6 January and 24 February 2018 editions as Gambaccini was absent due to weather disruption and illness. Due to the Covid-19 pandemic, the show was voice-tracked due to Gambaccini being unable to travel to Wogan House.

No editions was broadcast on 10 April 2021 and 17 April 2021 due to the Death and funeral of Prince Philip, Duke of Edinburgh.

Noel Gallagher guest hosted the show on 29 May 2021, to mark his birthday, becoming the first celebrity guest host in the show's history, playing music from the chart dated 25 May 1967 (his birth year) and 2 June 1979. Gary Davies guest hosted the show on 21 and 28 August 2021 and 2 July 2022.

Presenters
Franklin Engelmann (1955)
Alan Dell (1956 and 1957–58)
David Jacobs (September 1956 – September 1957; March 1958 – September 1961; September – December 1962)
Don Moss (September – December 1963)
Alan Freeman (September 1961 – April 2000)
Dale Winton (April 2000 – October 2010)
Tony Blackburn (November 2010 – February 2016)
Mark Goodier (Interim host between Blackburn's departure and Gambaccini's arrival, February 2016 – July 2016, plus two shows as stand in cover for Gambaccini in January and February 2018)
Paul Gambaccini (July 2016–present)
Gary Davies (three shows as stand-in cover for Gambaccini, 21 and 28 August 2021, 2 July 2022)
Scott Mills (one show as stand-in cover for Gambaccini, 16 April 2022)
Steve Wright (National Album Day specials, 15 October 2022)

Theme music 
Between 1961 and 1966, the theme tune was "At the Sign of the Swingin' Cymbal" written and performed by Brian Fahey and his Orchestra. In 1966 it was replaced with "Quite Beside The Point" by the Harry Roberts Sound but was reinstated in 1970.

References

External links

BBC Light Programme programmes
BBC Radio 1 programmes
BBC Radio 2 programmes
British music radio programmes
Music chart shows